Macaria artesiaria is a moth of the family Geometridae. It is found from the North Sea to Mongolia and the Amur River.

There are two generations per year with adults on wing from the end of May to July and from August to September. In the north of the range, there is one generation per year from mid June till August.

The larvae feed on Salix species. Larvae can be found from April to May and again from July to August. Pupation takes place between spun-together leaves - observed on (Salix), The larva lives on Salix, especially on small leaved species. It overwinters as an egg.

References

External links

Fauna Europaea
Lepiforum.de

Macariini
Moths of Europe
Taxa named by Michael Denis
Taxa named by Ignaz Schiffermüller
Moths described in 1775